Gneeveguilla are a Gaelic football team from County Kerry, Ireland. They play in the Kerry Intermediate Football Championship, Kerry County Football League (Division 1) and the East Kerry Senior Football Championship.

The club was founded in 1960. Its facilities include a bar, meeting rooms, office, kitchen, gym and dressing rooms. The hall received renovations and extensions in late 2013.

The club has won several county and provincial titles, and reached the All-Ireland Junior Club Football Championship final in 2022. Club member Ambrose O'Donovan was captain of the Kerry team which won the Centenary All-Ireland in 1984.

Honours 
 County Club Championships: (1) 1980
 Kerry Intermediate Football Championship: (1) 2010
 Munster Intermediate Club Football Championship: (1) 2010
 Kerry Premier Junior Football Championships: (1) 2021
Munster Junior Club Football Championship: (1) 2021
 Kerry Junior Football Championships: (2) 1978, 2000, 
 Kerry Minor Football Championships: (1) 1985
 East Kerry Senior Football Championships: (4) 1979, 1980, 1983, 2003

Notable players
 Charlie McCarthy
 Liam Murphy
 Ambrose O'Donovan

References

External links
 The Kerryman - Oct 2021 - Relentless Gneeveguilla swat Saints aside to return to Premier Junior final

Gaelic games clubs in County Kerry
Gaelic football clubs in County Kerry